Lake Minto ("where there are spotted seals") is a lake on western Ungava Peninsula, Nunavik, Quebec, Canada.

It was named by Canadian explorer and geologist Albert Peter Low in 1898 after Gilbert Elliot-Murray-Kynynmound, 4th Earl of Minto, who was Governor General of Canada at that time.

As such, it is used by canoeists especially when crossing Ungava from west to east.

It is considered one of the most beautiful lakes in northern Quebec.

References

Lakes of Nord-du-Québec